Silverstone Circuit is the "Home of British Motor Racing". Since it opened in 1948, Silverstone has hosted many major races for both cars and bike. Here are some of those race results:

Multiple winners

Grand Prix motorcycle racing

Major race results

Formula One World Championship

Sources:

Formula One non-championship races

Sources:

USAC Championship (Indycar)

Sources:

European Formula 5000 Championship
The BRSCC's F5000 championship, organised in the UK but taking in events across Europe, started in 1969. The title sponsorship moved from Guards to Rothmans to Shellsport before the series let in F1, F2 and Formula Atlantic cars for 1976.

Sources:

International Formula Two Championship

Sources:

International Formula 3000 Championship

FIA Formula 2 Series

GP2 Series

Sources:

Euroseries 3000

Auto GP

British Formula 3000/Formula Two Championship

Sources:

European Formula Three

Sources:

British Formula 3

Sources:

World Sportscars

Sources:

FIA GT Championship

Blancpain Endurance Cup

World Touring Championship

Sources:

European Touring Championship

Sources:

British Touring Car Championship

+  race was also a round of the FIA European Touring Championship
++ stopped early due to heavy rain and no points were awarded

Deutsche Tourenwagen Meisterschaft 

Sources:

Road Racing World Championship

Sources:

Superbike World Championship 

Sources:

British Superbike Championship

Sources:

References

Motorsport venues in England
Race results at motorsport venues